The 2023 IIHF World U18 Championship Division III was two international under-18 men's ice hockey tournaments organized by the International Ice Hockey Federation. The group A and B tournaments represent the sixth and seventh tier of competition at the 2023 IIHF World U18 Championships.

In the 'B' tournament New Zealand finished first place securing promotion to the 'A' tournament next year.  Returning to play, after missing three years of action, the kiwis needed Thailand to defeat Hong Kong on the final day to have a chance.  The hosts, South Africa, finished last but will not face relegation as this is the lowest tier.  It did, however, mark the second of three events to be hosted in Cape Town this year, a very unusual accomplishment for any IIHF nation.

Division III A

The Division III A tournament was played in Akureyri, Iceland, from 12 to 18 March 2023.

Participants

Final standings

Results
All times are local (UTC±0).

Division III B

The Division III B tournament was played in Cape Town, South Africa, from 13 to 16 March 2023.

Participants

Final standings

Results
All times are local (UTC+2).

References

IIHF World U18 Championship Division III
2023 IIHF World U18 Championships
IIHF
IIHF
IIHF
IIHF